Guiguzi is a collection of ancient Chinese texts compiled between the late Warring States period and the end of the Han Dynasty. The work, between 6,000–7,000 Chinese characters, discusses techniques of rhetoric. Although originally associated with the School of Diplomacy, the Guiguzi was later integrated into the Daoist canon.

Authorship 
There has been much speculation about the identity of the writer of Guiguzi: the origin of his name (literally 'The Sage of Ghost Valley') and the authenticity of the work as a whole. While there has been no final outcome to this discussion, Chinese scholars believe that the compilation reflects a genuine corpus of Warring States period writings on political lobbying. While most writers doubt the assertion that the Guiguzi was written by a single personality, the Records of the Grand Historian do refer to a Guigu Xiansheng (i.e., Mr. Guigu) who taught persuaders Su Qin and Zhang Yi. Thus, this Guigu is traditionally considered the founder of the School of Diplomacy, a school of thought which was particularly interested in rhetoric. Guigu Xiansheng is also said to have taught famous Warring States generals Sun Bin and Pang Juan. The association of the name Wang Xu is not generally held to be supported. Whereas books I and II are attributed to the same author, Book III is likely an addition by a later author.  There is no material in the text to support the view held by some that Guiguzi is a book on military tactics.

Contents 
Guiguzi comprises three books, with chapters on different strategies of observation and persuasion.

Translations 
There have been translations of Guiguzi into modern Chinese, German, English, and Russian (see below).  Almost all modern annotated texts and western translations rely heavily on the explanations of the texts attributed to the Eastern Jin scholar Tao Hongjing.

References

Further reading 
蕭登福《鬼谷子研究》. 2001 文津出版社
陈宇《鬼谷子兵法破解》. /E.2024
Guiguzi, China's First Treatise on Rhetoric: A Critical Translation and Commentary. Trans. Hui Wu. Carbondale, Ill.: Southern Illinois University Press, 2016.
Thunder in the Sky: Secrets on the Acquisition and Exercise of Power. Trans. Thomas Cleary. Boston: Shambbala Books, 1994.  
Michael Robert Borschat. "Guiguzi': A Textual Study and Translation". University of Washington Ph.D. Thesis, 1985. 
Chung Se Kimm, "Kuei-Kuh-Tse: Der Philosoph vom Teufelstal," 1927.
Robert van Gulik: 'Kuei-ku-tzu, The Philosopher of the Ghost Vale", "China", XIII, no 2 (May 1939).
«Гуй Гу-цзы». В кн: Искусство управления. Сост., пер., вступ. ст. и коммент. В.В. Малявина. М.: «Издательство Астрель»: «Издательство АСТ», 2003. С.244-318.
Xu Fuhong. Guiguzi Yan Jiu. Shanghai: Shanghai Classics Press, 2008.
Xu Fuhong. Guiguzi Jijiao Jizhu. Beihing: Zhonghua shuju, 2008.
Chen Puqing, Guiguzi xiangjie. Changsha, Hunan: Yuelu Press, 2005.
Du Yong. "On the Time Record of Guiguzi." Journal of Tianjing Normal University:; Social Science 170.6 (2003): 30-32.
Xiao Yuhan. Guiguzi zhuaqi: Quan jie zhanguo diyi quiren mieguozhishu. Beijing: Tuanjie shubanshe, 2002.
Xiao Dengfu. Guiguzi Yan Jiu. Taibei, Taiwan: Wenjin Press, 2001.
Daniel Coyle. "Guiguzi: On the Cosmological Axes of Chinese Persuasion." Dissertation. University of Hawaii, 1999.
Fang Lizhong. Guiguzi quanshu. Beijing: Shumu wenxian chubanshe, 1993.
Zhang Jianguo. Guiguzi shiyong zhimou daquan. Beijing: Meteorological Press, 1993.
Zhang Shixin. "Demystifying Guiguzi." Journal of Zhejiang Teachers University: Social Science Edition 2 (1990): 42-47.

External links
 
 Guiguzi on Ctext

Chinese philosophy
History of Zhengzhou
Chinese literature